Sphaerechinus granularis is a species of sea urchin in the family Toxopneustidae, commonly known as the violet sea urchin, or sometimes the purple sea urchin (though the latter is also a common name for a Pacific sea urchin Strongylocentrotus purpuratus). Its range includes the Mediterranean Sea and eastern Atlantic Ocean.

Description 
S. granularis is a large sea urchin, somewhat flattened dorsally and growing to fifteen centimetres in diameter. There are two distinct colour forms. The test is purple in both but one has purple spines and the other white. The spines are short and blunt, all the same length, and arranged neatly in rows.

Distribution and habitat 
S. granularis is found in the Mediterranean Sea and the eastern Atlantic Ocean, from the Channel Islands south to Cape Verde and the Gulf of Guinea. It favours sheltered locations and lives on rocks covered  with seaweed or gravelly substrates. It is also found in meadows of the seagrass Posidonia oceanica.

Biology 
S. granularis often covers itself with morsels of algae and shell fragments, which are held in place by the tube feet and by the claw-like structures known as pedicellaria. It grazes on algae, especially encrusting coralline algae, seagrass blades and their epiphytic organisms and detritus.

Spawning takes place at any time of year but the peak period is spring and early summer. Eggs and sperm are liberated into the water column, where egg fertilisation takes place. The larvae are planktonic. After several moults, the echinopluteus larva settles and undergoes metamorphosis before developing into a juvenile.

Ecology
In Tunisia, S. granularis is found living in association with two other species of sea urchins, Centrostephanus longispinus and Paracentrotus lividus. It is preyed upon by the starfish Marthasterias glacialis and Luidia ciliaris.

Use as food
The gonads of S. granularis are considered a delicacy in Italy, Provence and Catalonia.

References

External links

 

Toxopneustidae
Fauna of the Atlantic Ocean
Fauna of the Mediterranean Sea
Taxa named by Jean-Baptiste Lamarck
Animals described in 1816